Royal Lunch is the ninth studio album by avant-garde band King Missile, released on September 21, 2004, by Important Records.

Reception

Alex Henderson of AllMusic commends the band's esoteric compositions while saying "Hall comes up with so many nutty, irreverently absurd references that he becomes disarming" and "even when Hall is telling listeners how much he despises Attorney General John Ashcroft and Vice President Dick Cheney, he comes across as more of an eccentric than an agitator." Ink 19 called the album "a worthy collection with some college radio airplay potential" and "thought-provoking and interesting, although it does tend to rely on profanity, especially on the mercifully short "Pain Series VIII: Stubbed Toe." Lollipop Magazine criticized the album's writing, saying "tracks such as the sardonic, spoken word "America Kicks Ass" ("We want cheap clothes, cheap oil, whatever we want. And if they don’t like it, they can suck on it. Because the rest of the world is America’s bitch") allude to old punk, but never get quite as interesting."

Track listing

Personnel
Adapted from The Psychopathology of Everyday Life liner notes.

King Missile
 Sasha Forte – bass guitar, guitar, keyboards, violin, backing vocals
 John S. Hall – lead vocals, "bad drums and percussion (15)
 Bradford Reed – pencilina, piano, synthesizers, sampler, drums, percussion, guitar, backing vocals, production, engineering

Additional perforers
 Jane Scarpantoni – cello (2, 10)
 Jack Sprat – guitar (2, 8, 15)

Production and design
 Matt Mason – mastering
 Yuriko Tada – cover art

Release history

References

External links 
 
 Royal Lunch at Discogs (list of releases)

King Missile albums
2004 albums